This is a list of notable Swedish visual artists.

A 
Emma Adbåge (born 1982), illustrator
Ottilia Adelborg (1855–1936), illustrator
Ulla Adlerfelt (1736–1765)
Sofia Adlersparre (1808–1862), painter
Mattias Adolfsson (born 1965), illustrator
Gösta Adrian-Nilsson GAN (1884–1965), painter
Ivan Aguéli (1869–1917), painter and writer
Märta Afzelius (1887–1961), textile artist
Sofia Ahlbom (1823–1868)
Lea Ahlborn (1829–1891), printmaker
Modhir Ahmed (born 1956), painter, printmaker
Margareta Alströmer (1763–1816), painter
Agneta Andersson (born 1958), sculptor
Christian Pontus Andersson (born 1977), sculptor
J. Tobias Anderson (born 1971)
Karin Mamma Andersson (born 1962), painter
Lena Anderson (born 1939), illustrator and children's writer
Oskar Andersson (1877–1906), cartoonist
Olof Arborelius (1842–1915), painter
Tage Åsén (born 1943), painter

B 
Barbro Bäckström (1939–1990), sculptor
Inge Bagge (1916–1988), sculptor
John Bauer (1882–1918), painter, illustrator
Julia Beck (1853-1935), painter and calligrapher
Richard Bergh (1858–1919), painter
Jan Berglin (born 1960)
Elisabeth Bergstrand-Poulsen (1887–1955), painter, illustrator, textile artist
Tobias Bernstrup (born 1970), performance artist
Elsa Beskow (1874–1953), painter
Natanael Beskow (1865–1953)
Johanna Billing (born 1973)
Torsten Billman (1909–1989), printmaker, drawer, painter
Eva Billow (1902–1993), illustrator
Hugo Birger (1854–1887)
Oscar Björck 1860–1929, painter
Carl Oscar Borg (1879–1947)
Agnes Börjesson (1827–1900)
Carl Fredrik von Breda (1759–1818)

C 
John Fabian Carlson (1875–1945), painter
Otto Gustaf Carlsund (1897–1948), art critic, painter
Maria Carowsky (1723–1793)
Kerstin Cardon (1843–1924)
Charlotta Cedercreutz (1736–1815)
Siv Cedering (1939–2007), poet, writer, and artist
Christina Charlotta Cederström (1760–1832), painter, composer, poet
Gustaf Cederström (1845–1933)
Moki Cherry (1943–2009), interdisciplinary artist and designer
Ingvar Cronhammar (1947–2021), sculptor based in Denmark
Lena Cronqvist (born 1938), painter, graphic artist and sculptor
Elisabeth Czapek (1860–1949), miniature painter

D 
Michael Dahl (1659–1743), painter
Peter Dahl (1934-2019), painter, printmaker
Elsie Dahlberg-Sundberg (1916–2005), sculptor
Jonas Dahlberg (born 1970)
Ibe Dahlquist (1924–1986), silversmith, jeweller
Nils Dardel (1888–1943), drawer, painter
Siri Derkert (1888–1973), painter, sculptor
Nathalie Djurberg (born 1978)
Brita Drewsen (1887–1983), textile artist active in Denmark
Fredrika Eleonora von Düben (1738–1808), textile artist

E 
Viking Eggeling (1880–1925), avant-garde artist and filmmaker
Anna Maria Ehrenstrahl (1666–1729), painter
Marianne Ehrenström  (1773–1867), painter
Annika Ekdahl (born 1955), textile artist
Märta af Ekenstam (1880–1939), silversmith
Benny Ekman (born 1955), painter
Marie-Louise Ekman (born 1944), filmmaker, painter
Emma Ekwall (1838–1925), painter
Knut Ekwall (1843–1912), painter, drawer, printmaker
Carl Eldh (1873–1954), sculptor
Ester Ellqvist (1880–1918), painter
Albert Engström (1869–1940), drawer, artist, writer
Sven Erixson (1899–1970), painter
Lisa Erlandsdotter (1774–1854)

F 
Öyvind Fahlström (1928–1976), painter, artist
Dror Feiler (born 1951), artist and musician
Edith Fischerström (1881–1967), painter, woodcutter and sculptor
Gustaf Fjæstad (1868–1948), painter
Maja Fjæstad (1873–1961), painter, textile artist, engraver
Jonny Forsström (1944–2017), painter
John Erik Franzén (born 1942), painter
Agnes de Frumerie (1869–1937), sculptor, ceramist
David Frumerie (1641–1677), painter
Mauritz Frumerie (1775–1853), medal engraver, lithographer

G 
Carl Johan De Geer (born 1938), artist
Wilhelm von Gegerfelt (1844–1920)
Esther Gehlin (1892–1949), Danish-Swedish painter
Felix Gmelin (born 1963)
Maja Gunn (born 1978), fashion designer
Maria Johanna Görtz (1783–1853), florist painter
Brita Granström (born 1969), painter
Eric Grate (1896–1983), sculptor, drawer, painter, printmaker
Isaac Hirsche Grünewald (1889–1946), painter
Ulf Kjell Gür (born 1951), theatre producer and singer-musician

H 
Gillis Hafström (1841–1921), painter and restorer
Axel Haig (1835–1921), illustrator
Berta Hansson (1910–1994), painter, sculptor and textile artist
Per Hasselberg (1850–1894), sculptor
Carl Michael von Hausswolff (born 1956)
Hans Hedberg (1917–2007), sculptor
Snövit Hedstierna (born 1980), visual artist, performance artist and director. 
Gustav Hellberg (born 1967)
Amalia von Helvig (1776–1831)
Anna Maria Hilfeling (1713–1783), miniaturist
Carl Fredrik Hill (1849–1911), painter
Lars Hillersberg (1937–2004), cartoonist, painter, drawer
Sigrid Hjertén (1885–1948), painter
Bror Hjorth (1894–1968), painter and sculptor
Olle Hjortzberg (1872–1959), drawer, painter, printmaker
Johan Fredrik Höckert (1826–1866)
Gerda Höglund (1878–1973), painter
Ola and Marie Höglund, contemporary glass artists
Janna Holmstedt (born 1972), installation artist
Rose-Marie Huuva (born 1943), visual artist, poet

I 
Sven Inge (1935–2008)
Arne Isacsson (1917–2010), painter
Karl Isakson (1878–1922), painter
Helena Sophia Isberg (1819–1875)

J 
Eugène Jansson (1862–1915), painter
August Jernberg (1826–1896)
Einar Jolin (1890–1976), painter
Arvid Jorm (1892–1964), painter printmaker
Ernst Josephson (1851–1906), painter
Daniel Jouseff (born 1975), painter

K 
Gottfrid Kallstenius (1861–1943), painter
Ewert Karlsson (1918–2004), drawer, cartoonist
Alexander Klingspor (born 1977), painter, sculptor
Hilma af Klint (1862–1944), painter
Per Krafft the Elder (1724–1793), portraitist
Per Krafft the Younger (1777–1863), portrait painter
Wilhelmina Krafft (1778–1828), painter and miniaturist
Nils Kreuger (1858–1930), painter
Julius Kronberg (1850–1921), painter
Hans Krondahl (1929–2018), painter, tapestry weaver, textile artist and textile designer
Johan Krouthén (1859–1932), painter
Amalia Wilhelmina Königsmarck (1663–1740), painter

L 
Niclas Lafrensen (1737–1807)
Lisa Larson (born 1931), ceramicist
Annika Larsson (born 1972), video
Carl Larsson (1859–1928), painter
Bo Christian Larsson (born 1976)
Jens Olof Lasthein (born 1964), photographer
Lars Lerin (born 1954), painter, printmaker, illustrator, writer
Louise Lidströmer (born 1948), artist
Bruno Liljefors (1860–1939), painter
David Liljemark (born 1973), artist
Amalia Lindegren (1814–1891), painter
Bengt Lindström (1925–2008), painter
Sven Ljungberg (1913–2010), painter, printmaker, writer
Torsten Löwgren (1903–1991), painter
Jonas Lundh (born 1965), painter
Evert Lundquist (1904–1994), painter, printmaker
Cecilia Lundqvist (born 1971)

M 
Elias Martin (1739–1818)
Ulrika Melin (1767–1834)
Carl Milles (1875–1955), sculptor
Aleksandra Mir (born 1967)

N 
Einar Nerman (1888–1983), drawer, illustrator
Ida Göthilda Nilsson (1840–1920), sculptor
Lars Nilsson (born 1966)
Vera Nilsson (1888–1979), painter
Bengt Nordenberg (1822–1902)
Anna Nordgren (1847–1916)
Anna Nordlander (1843–1879)
Gerhard Nordström (1925–2019) painter, graphic artist
Jockum Nordström (born 1963), illustrator
Karl Nordström (1855–1923)
Max Magnus Norman (born 1973), artist

O 
Elisabeth Ohlson Wallin (born 1961), photographer
Claes Oldenburg (born 1929), sculptor
Barbro Östlihn (1930–1995), painter
Oscar Akermo, Tattooist, painter

P 
Gustaf Wilhelm Palm (1810–1890), painter
Anna Palm de Rosa (1859–1924), painter
Ulrika Pasch (1735–1796), painter
Georg Pauli (1855–1935), painter
Peter Adolf Persson (1862–1914), painter
Axel Petersson Döderhultarn (1868–1925), sculptor
Anna Petrus (1886–1949), sculptor, graphic artist and designer
Albertus Pictor (c. 1440 – 1509), painter
Carl Gustaf Pilo (1711–1793), painter
 Vicken von Post-Börjesson (1886–1950), sculptor, painter, ceramicist

R 
Siri Rathsman (1895–1974), surrealist artist
Oscar Gustave Rejlander (1813–1875), photographer
Emma Rendel (born 1976), graphic novel artist
Carl Fredrik Reuterswärd (1934-2016), poet, sculptor
Oscar Reutersvärd (1915–2002)
Lennart Rodhe (1916–2005), painter
Maria Rohl (1801–1875), sketch artist
Lotten Rönquist (1864–1912), painter
Georg von Rosen (1843–1923), painter
Alexander Roslin (1718–1798), painter
Celina Runeborg (1878–1977), painter

S 
Anna Sahlström (1876–1956), painter and engraver
Birger Sandzén (1871–1954), painter
Bertram Schmiterlöw (1920–2002)
Anna Brita Sergel (1733–1819), textile artist
Johan Tobias Sergel (1740–1814), sculptor
Henri Sert (1938–1964), painter
Josabeth Sjöberg (1812–1882)
Monica Sjöö (1938–2005), painter, writer 
Carl Eneas Sjöstrand (1828–1906), sculptor
Maja Sjöström (1868–1961), textile artist
Sigrid Snoilsky (1813–1856), painter and countess
Louis Sparre (1863–1964), painter, designer and draughtsman
Wendela Gustafva Sparre (1772–1855)
Ulla Stenberg (1792–1858), textile artist
Gustava Johanna Stenborg (1776–1819)
August Strindberg (1849–1912), writer, painter
Per B Sundberg (born 1964), glass and ceramic artist
Max Walter Svanberg (1912–1994), drawer, printmaker, painter
Roland Svensson (1910–2003), painter, illustrator, writer

T 
Gustaf Tenggren (1896–1973), painter, animator, illustrator
Anna Maria Thelott (1683–1710), engraver, illustrator, printmaker, miniaturist painter
Gerda Tirén (1858–1928), painter and illustrator
Johan Tirén (1853–1911), painter; husband of the above
Axel Törneman (1880–1925), painter
Palle Torsson (born 1970), artist
Carl Trägårdh (1861–1899), artist

U 
Urban målare (16th century), "Urban the Painter", painter

V 
Lars Vilks (born 1946), artist

W 
Alfred Wahlberg (1834–1906)
Gerda Wallander (1860-1926), painter
Bianca Wallin (1909–2006), painter 
David Wallin (1876–1957), painter
Magnus Wallin (born 1965)
Sigurd Wallin (1916–1999), painter
Gösta Wallmark (1928-2017), artist, painter, sculptor
Wilhelmina Wendt (1896–1988), silversmith
Peter Weiss (1916–1982), writer, painter, artist
Anna Wengberg (1885–1936), painter
Gösta Werner (1909–1989), painter
Adolf Ulrik Wertmüller (1751–1811), painter
Jan Widströmer (born 1944), painter
Agnes Wieslander (1873–1934), painter
Carl Wilhelmson (1866–1928), painter
Richard Winkler (born 1969), painter, sculptor

Z 
Kristoffer Zetterstrand (born 1973), painter
Anders Zorn (1860–1920), printmaker, painter

See also
List of Swedish women artists
List of Swedish women photographers
Royal Swedish Academy of Arts''

Artists
Swedish artists
 List of Swedish artists